Cochlis vittata is a species of predatory sea snail, a marine gastropod mollusk in the family Naticidae, the moon snails.

Description

Distribution

References

 Hidalgo, J. G. (1873). Description de deux espèces de Natica des mers d'Espagne. Journal de Conchyliologie. 21: 332-335.

External links
 Gmelin J.F. (1791). Vermes. In: Gmelin J.F. (Ed.) Caroli a Linnaei Systema Naturae per Regna Tria Naturae, Ed. 13. Tome 1(6). G.E. Beer, Lipsiae
 Philippi, R. A. (1849-1853). Die Gattungen Natica und Amaura. In Abbildungen nach der Natur mit Beschreibungen. In: Küster, H. C., Ed. Systematisches Conchylien-Cabinet von Martini und Chemnitz. Neu herausgegeben und vervollständigt. Zweiten Bandes erste Abtheilung
 Reeve, L. A. (1855). Monograph of the genus Natica. In: Conchologia Iconica, or, illustrations of the shells of molluscous animals, vol. 9, pls 1-30, and unpaginated text. L. Reeve & Co., London
 Pallary, P. (1920). Exploration scientifique du Maroc organisée par la Société de Géographie de Paris et continuée par la Société des Sciences Naturelles du Maroc. Deuxième fascicule. Malacologie. i>Larose, Rabat et Paris pp. 108. 1(1): ma
  Röding, P.F. (1798). Museum Boltenianum sive Catalogus cimeliorum e tribus regnis naturæ quæ olim collegerat Joa. Fried Bolten, M. D. p. d. per XL. annos proto physicus Hamburgensis. Pars secunda continens Conchylia sive Testacea univalvia, bivalvia & multivalvia. Trapp, Hamburg. viii, 199 pp.

Naticidae
Gastropods described in 1791